Phou Den Din National Protected Area or National Biodiversity Conservation Area (NBCA) is a protected area in northern Laos, covering 2,200 km2 in Phongsaly Province. It was designated a National Biodiversity Conservation Area in 1993.
The name is also spelt Phou Dene Dinh and Phou Daen Din. The conservation area borders  Vietnam, and its terrain is hilly, rising to over 2,000 meters. Among the animals found in the area are elephants, gibbons, macaques, gaurs, bantengs, Asiatic black bears, sun bears, leopards, and tigers. It also has a high density of lesser fish eagles and crested kingfishers. The area is not easily accessible, but can be reached by boat or on foot.

See also
Protected areas of Laos

References

External links
Ecotourism Laos - Protected Areas

Geography of Phongsaly province
Tourist attractions in Laos
National Biodiversity Conservation Areas